Gasha may refer to:
Gasha (Peru), a mountain in Peru
Gasha (singer), from Cameroon
Gasha, Republic of Dagestan, a rural locality in Dagestan, Russia
Gasha, Kachin, a village in Mansi Township, Kachin State, Burma
Gasha, a diminutive of the Russian male first name Agafon
Gasha, a diminutive of the Russian male first name Agap
Gasha, a diminutive of the Russian male first name Agapit